Bélapátfalva is a district in north-eastern part of Heves County. Bélapátfalva is also the name of the town where the district seat is found. The district is located in the Northern Hungary Statistical Region. This district is a part of Bükk Mountains geographical region.

Geography 
Bélapátfalva District borders with Ózd District and Kazincbarcika District (Borsod-Abaúj-Zemplén County) to the north, Miskolc District (Borsod-Abaúj-Zemplén County) to the east, Eger District to the south, Pétervására District to the west. The number of the inhabited places in Bélapátfalva District is 8.

Municipalities 
The district has 1 town and 7 villages.
(ordered by population, as of 1 January 2012)

The bolded municipality is the city.

Demographics

In 2011, it had a population of 8,978 and the population density was 50/km².

Ethnicity
Besides the Hungarian majority, the main minority is the Roma (approx. 500).

Total population (2011 census): 8,978
Ethnic groups (2011 census): Identified themselves: 8,209 persons:
Hungarians: 7,695 (93.74%)
Gypsies: 421 (5.13%)
Others and indefinable: 93 (1.13%)
Approx. 1,000 persons in Bélapátfalva District did not declare their ethnic group at the 2011 census.

Religion
Religious adherence in the county according to 2011 census:

Catholic – 4,246 (Roman Catholic – 4,218; Greek Catholic – 28);
Reformed – 1,274;
Evangelical – 20; 
other religions – 96; 
Non-religious – 1,081; 
Atheism – 65;
Undeclared – 2,196.

Gallery

See also
List of cities and towns of Hungary

References

External links
 Postal codes of the Bélapátfalva District

Districts in Heves County